The Busa language, also known as Odiai (Uriai), is spoken in three hamlets of northwestern Papua New Guinea. There were 244 speakers at the time of the 2000 census. One of the hamlets where Busa is spoken is Busa in Rawei ward, Green River Rural LLG, Sandaun Province.

Busa speakers are in extensive trade and cultural contact with Yadë, a distantly related language spoken in six villages to the north of the Busa area.

Classification
Busa may be one of the Kwomtari languages. Foley (2018) classifies Busa as a language isolate (meaning unclassified), but does not exclude the possibility that it may have a distant relationship with the Torricelli languages.

Pronouns
Pronouns are:

{| 
|+ Busa basic pronouns
!  !! sg !! pl
|-
! 1
| mu || mi
|-
! 2
| colspan="2" style="text-align: center;" | am
|-
! 3m
| a ~ ari || ti
|-
! 3f
| tu
|}

Basic vocabulary
Busa basic vocabulary listed in Foley (2018):

{| 
|+ Busa basic vocabulary
! gloss !! Busa
|-
| ‘bad’ || buriambu
|-
| ‘bird’ || wana
|-
| ‘black’ || baro
|-
| ‘breast’ || nã
|-
| ‘ear’ || dina
|-
| ‘eye’ || dena
|-
| ‘fire’ || eβa
|-
| ‘leaf’ || iri
|-
| ‘liver’ || munã
|-
| ‘louse’ || amo
|-
| ‘man’ || nutu
|-
| ‘mother’ || mẽ
|-
| ‘nape’ || onaiba
|-
| ‘older brother’ || aba
|-
| ‘road’ || ti
|-
| ‘stone’ || bito
|-
| ‘tooth’ || wuti
|-
| ‘tree’ || nda
|-
| ‘water’ || ani
|-
| ‘woman’ || ele
|-
| ‘one’ || otutu
|-
| ‘two’ || tinana
|-
| ‘three’ || wunana
|-
| ‘four’ || aite
|-
| ‘five’ || yumnadi
|}

The following basic vocabulary words are from Conrad and Dye (1975), as cited in the Trans-New Guinea database:

{| class="wikitable sortable"
! gloss !! Busa
|-
| head || owuna
|-
| hair || etete
|-
| ear || dinʌ
|-
| eye || dena
|-
| nose || wʌti
|-
| tooth || wuti
|-
| tongue || dʌgʌrʌ
|-
| louse || amo
|-
| dog || inʌri
|-
| pig || waru
|-
| bird || wʌnʌ
|-
| egg || mʌiyʌ
|-
| blood || aɔ̨
|-
| bone || ab̶uwibʌ
|-
| skin || tati
|-
| breast || ną
|-
| tree || nda
|-
| man || nutu
|-
| woman || tɔ
|-
| water || ani
|-
| stone || bitɔ
|-
| road, path || ti
|-
| eat || muniʌren
|-
| one || otutu
|-
| two || tinʌnʌ
|}

Affixes
Busa subject agreement affixes are:

{| 
|+ Busa subject agreement affixes
!  !! sg !! pl
|-
! 1
| ma- || ma-
|-
! 2
| a- || a-
|-
! 3
| m _r_- || m-
|-
! 3
| f || _w_-
|}

The Busa possessive suffix -ni is also found in proto-Sepik as the dative suffix *ni, as well as in Ama, a Left May language.

References

External links
Odiai language word list at TransNewGuinea.org

Unclassified languages of New Guinea
Languages of Sandaun Province
Senu River languages